The Walkerszeller Bach is a river in Bavaria, Germany. It flows into the Banzerbach west of Pleinfeld.

See also
List of rivers of Bavaria

Rivers of Bavaria
Weißenburg-Gunzenhausen
Rivers of Germany